Otostegia is a genus of flowering plants in the family Lamiaceae, first described in 1834. It is native to eastern Africa and the Middle East.

Species
 Otostegia ellenbeckii Gürke - Ethiopia
 Otostegia ericoidea Ryding - Somalia
 Otostegia erlangeri Gürke - Ethiopia + Somalia
 Otostegia fruticosa (Forssk.) Schweinf. ex Penzig - Cameroon, Sudan, Ethiopia, Eritrea, Djibouti, Saudi Arabia, Yemen, Israel, Sinai,  Palestine, Jordan
 Otostegia hildebrandtii (Vatke & Kurtz) Sebald - Somalia
 Otostegia integrifolia Benth. - Ethiopia + Yemen
 Otostegia migiurtiana Sebald - Somalia
 Otostegia modesta S.Moore - Ethiopia + Somalia
 Otostegia tomentosa A.Rich - Ethiopia + Somalia + Sudan

References 

Lamiaceae
Lamiaceae genera